O'Higgins F.C. Fútbol Joven are the youth team of O'Higgins. They currently play in the Fútbol Joven de Chile, the highest level of youth football in Chile. The club enter teams Under-9 to Under-19 in the leagues. The club is part of the Serie de Oro in the General Table of the tournament.

History

Since 2006, when O'Higgins reached the promotion for the Primera División, the different generations of the youth teams of the club have given very good results being seen as one of the best formators clubs in the country, including players like Aníbal González, Nelson Tapia and Joel Molina.

As a result, many players have left the club to play for other teams, such as Luis Casanova who currently plays in Unión Española, and Cristian Cuevas who was a buy for the English club Chelsea in $2.6 million, after his participation in the 2013 Torneo de Transición and in the 2013 South American Youth Championship. But also the club maintained many players in the current first-team, such as Bastián San Juan, Saúl Flores, Santiago Lizana, Felipe Ochagavía, Benjamín Vidal, Cristhian Venegas and Cristian Araya.

On 26 July 2013, the U-17 will participate in the 2013 Milk Cup, on the Group 4 in the Premier Section, when their group will play against the English clubs Newcastle United and Liverpool F.C., and against the home club County Armagh. This is the first tournament appearance of the club, and the first time of the club playing in Europe. On the 2014 edition, the club finished in the fourth place in the Junior Category, after lose against Plymouth Argyle in the third-place match. On the 2015 edition, the club won the Globe Cup in the Premier Category, after draw with Motherwell (2–2) and beating Vendée (1–0), Orange County Blues (3–0), Málaga (3–0), and Newcastle United (2–0) in the final, finishing fifth in the final table.

Coaches

Youth teams
  Cristián Arán (U-19 and U-18)
  Ítalo Pinochet (U-17)
  Fred Gayoso (U-16)
  Víctor Fuentes (U-15)

Child's teams
  Manuel Cáceres (U-14 and U-13)
  Manuel Alarcón (U-12 and U-11)
  Luis Medina (U-10 and U-9)

Teams

Youth teams
 Under-19
 Under-18
 Under-17
 Under-16
 Under-15

Child's teams
 Under-14
 Under-13
 Under-12
 Under-11
 Under-10
 Under-9

Players

Under-17 squad

The following 18 players were called up to the squad for the 2015 NI Milk Cup.

1. This players are part of the Fútbol Joven de Chile but also have appearances in the first-team.

Honours

Domestic

Primera División

 Fútbol Joven Under-15 (2): 2014 Apertura, 2014 Clausura
 Fútbol Joven Under-13 (2): 2012 Clausura, 2014 Clausura
 Fútbol Joven Under-12 (1): 2010

Copa Chile
 Copa Chile Under-18 (2): 2009, 2011

International

Milk Cup

 Premier Cup (1): 2016
 Globe Cup (1): 2015

International competitions

Milk Cup
 Milk Cup (3): 2013, 2014, 2015, 2016

References

External links

Official websites

  
  O'Higgins Fútbol Joven at official website
  O'Higgins at the ANFP official website

News sites

  La Celeste a Fan site
  Capo de Provincia a Fan site
  Soy Celeste a Fan site

O'Higgins F.C.
Association football clubs established in 1955
Football clubs in Chile
1955 establishments in Chile

es:Fútbol Joven de O'Higgins de Rancagua